The India national under-16 basketball team, is controlled by the Basketball Federation of India and represents India at the international under-17 (under age 17) and under-16 (under age 16) basketball competitions.

The best performance of the team so far is securing 5th place at the 2022 FIBA U16 Asian Championship.

Competitive history

FIBA U-17 World Cup
  2010 to  2022 : Did not qualify

FIBA U-16 Asian Championship
  2009 : 10th
  2011 : 10th
  2013 : 11th
  2015 : 13th
  2017 : 13th
  2022 : 5th

See also
India men's national basketball team
India men's national under-18 basketball team
India women's national under-16 basketball team

References

Men's national under-16 basketball teams
Under
Basketball